ASC Black Stars are a French Guiana football club that play in the French Guiana Championnat National.

References 

Football clubs in French Guiana